Glenn Wilhide (born 1958) is an American screenwriter and television producer.

Early life and family 
Wilhide was born in Maryland, USA, to American parents. His family moved to the UK when he was a child and he was educated at Leighton Park School in Reading, Berkshire, and the University of York where he read English and History of Art. He is married to Jennifer Caron Hall, the daughter of actress and ballerina Leslie Caron and the late Peter Hall.

His paternal grandfather, also called Glenn Calvin Wilhide, was the inventor of the first hand power drill, for the Black and Decker company in Towson, Maryland.

Producer 
Glenn Wilhide was co-founder of the independent production company called ZED Ltd in 1985, and he and partner Sophie Belhetchet went on to produce documentaries, talk shows, and dramas including The Camomile Lawn, The Manageress and The Peacock Spring, the latter starring Naveen Andrews, Wilhide's wife Jennifer Hall, and Hattie Morahan in her first role.

Wilhide's first full producer credit was a feature film at Zed titled The Road Home, directed by Jerzy Kaszubowski and shot in Poland for Channel 4 in 1985, when Wilhide was 27 years old. It was released as ‘’Cienie’’ in Polish one year later.

Wilhide disbanded ZED Ltd in 1996, and began working as a freelance producer at Granada TV, developing projects primarily with Gub Neal in the drama department.

The Royle Family Series 1
In 1997 Wilhide produced the first series of the award-winning comedy The Royle Family starring Caroline Aherne and Craig Cash, which they co-wrote with Henry Normal. It was first broadcast on BBC2 on 14 September 1998. Reviews for The Royle Family immediately recognised the ground-breaking nature of the comedy and its production quality. Tim Hulse in the Express, wrote on October 31: "It's as if Samuel Beckett had been commissioned to write a sitcom." "Banal, repetitive, vulgar...and very funny" said the Time Out critic on October 10. The Guardian reviewer imagined the distinguished playwright Samuel Beckett endorsing the first series above all subsequent series of the show. Of the second episode, The Guardian critic Nancy Banks-Smith wrote: "This is a rivetingly original slice of life, like a bomb-damaged house displaying its vacancy to the world...The comedy is in the beautiful truth of observation, which hits the nail on the thumb."  By late December The Royle Family had won Best New Television Comedy at The British Comedy Awards, and it ranks 31 in the BFI TV 100.

Other work
The following year Glenn Wilhide produced Mrs Merton and Malcolm with the Royle Family team; both shows were made by Granada TV for the BBC.

The drama Metropolis (2000) (Granada Television for ITV), about a group of recent graduate friends finding their feet in London, was both produced and directed by Glenn Wilhide, with addition direction by Tim Whitby 
and it was written by Peter Morgan.

Wilhide produced The Camomile Lawn (1992), directed by his father-in-law Peter Hall and starring Felicity Kendal, Jennifer Ehle, Toby Stevens, Tara Fitzgerald and a young Rebecca Hall. It was nominated for a BAFTA for Best Drama Series and won the BAFTA for Best Costume. In 2018 it was named No 4 in The 60 Best British TV Shows of All Time by The Daily Telegraph.

Also at Zed and with Sophie Belhetchet, Wilhide produced The Manageress (1993) about a female manager of a football club. Cherie Lunghi starred as boss Gabriella Benson, co-stars included Tom Georgeson and Warren Clarke, and it was commissioned for a second series. 
The Manageress was said to be ahead of its time and to influence how women viewed football. A year after the second series finished, Karren Brady became the first female managing director of a club - (the Birmingham City Football Club). A BBC documentary made about her was titled The Real Life Manageress.

TV and film producer

Screenwriting

Wilhide's first feature film screenplay, a financial thriller called Extreme Cities, was optioned by Overbrook Entertainment and set to begin filming directed by Roger Donaldson under the title of first Cities and then Icarus Factor starring Clive Owen, Anil Kapoor, Kirsten Dunst and Orlando Bloom in the spring of 2012, but the project stalled.

References

External links
 
 BBC_Royle Family
 `

American male screenwriters
British television producers
American television producers
American television writers
American film producers
Living people
1958 births